Hakan Dinç (born 1963) is a Turkish racing driver. He made his first amateur race in 1986, and won the Hittite Rally in 1987.

He trained with the Jim Russell Racing Driver School in 1993, and earned an instructor's license. One year after, he established the Safari Racing School. In 1994, Dinç competed in the fledgling Turkish Formula Three Championship.

Hakan Dinç won the Group N class of the Turkish Rally Championship in 2004, a year in which he also made his debut in the World Rally Championship, when he entered the Rally of Turkey; in this event, he won the Group N4 category. The following year, he switched to a Skoda Octavia WRC for both the Turkish Rally Championship and the Rally of Turkey, but mechanical issues forced him out of the latter event on the fourth stage. In 2006, Dinç competed in the Rally of Turkey for the third time, which was part of the World Rally Championship, in a Group N Subaru Impreza; he finished fourth in class. In 2007, he transferred to Ford Rallye Sport Turkey Team, driving a Ford Focus WRC.

References

External links
Hakan Dinç statistics
Safari Motorsport

1963 births
Sportspeople from Istanbul
Turkish rally drivers
Living people
World Rally Championship drivers